Evelyn Lee Marie Sampi (born 6 October 1988) is an Australian actress. She is of Bardi Australian Aboriginal and Scottish descent. 

Sampi starred in the 2002 film Rabbit-Proof Fence, as child of the stolen generation Molly Craig. The film itself is based on the true novel Follow the Rabbit-Proof Fence written by Craig's daughter Doris Pilkington Garimara. Sampi won the 4th Annual Lexus Inside Film Awards for Best Actress on 6 November 2002 for her role in the film.

Sampi appeared in the 2007 Australian drama The Circuit as the character Leonie.

Everlyn now lives in Broome, Western Australia.

External links
 Official Site

1988 births
Australian child actresses
Australian people of Scottish descent
Australian film actresses
Indigenous Australian actresses
Indigenous Australians from Western Australia
Living people
People from Derby, Western Australia